Dehu (also Romanized as Dehū; also known as Deyyū) is a village in Kal Rural District, Eshkanan District, Lamerd County, Fars Province, Iran. At the 2006 census, its population was 50, in 14 families.

References 

Populated places in Lamerd County